William Williams (May 11, 1821 – April 22, 1896) was an American lawyer and politician who served four terms as a U.S. Representative from Indiana from 1867 to 1875.

Biography
Born near Carlisle, Pennsylvania, Williams attended the common schools and received a very limited education.
He studied law and was admitted to the bar in 1845 and commenced practice in Warsaw, Indiana. Williams served as Treasurer of Kosciusko County in 1852.
He resigned the office of treasurer for an ultimately unsuccessful bid for Lieutenant Governor in 1853.

Williams managed the Bank of Warsaw for several years, and also served as director of the Fort Wayne and Chicago Railway from 1854 to 1856, and as director of the Michigan City prison from 1859 to 1862. He served in the Union Army as commandant of Camp Allen in Fort Wayne, in 1862 and as paymaster of Volunteers, with headquarters at Louisville, Kentucky, until the close of the war.

Congress 
Williams was elected as a Republican to the Fortieth and to the three succeeding Congresses (March 4, 1867 – March 3, 1875).
He served as chairman of the Committee on Expenditures in the Department of War (Fortieth through Forty-third Congresses).
He did not run in 1874, and returned to Warsaw to practice law.

In 1882, Williams was appointed by President Arthur as Chargé d'Affaires to Paraguay and Uruguay and served until July 21, 1885.

Later career and death 
He returned to Warsaw, Indiana, in 1885 and retired from active business pursuits. He died there on April 22, 1896, and was interred in Oakwood Cemetery.

References
 Retrieved on 2009-04-24

|- style="text-align: center;"

|-

1821 births
1896 deaths
People from Carlisle, Pennsylvania
People of Indiana in the American Civil War
Ambassadors of the United States to Uruguay
Union Army officers
19th-century American diplomats
19th-century American politicians
Military personnel from Pennsylvania
Republican Party members of the United States House of Representatives from Indiana